Pamidimarru is a village in Guntur district of the Indian state of Andhra Pradesh. It is located in Nagaram mandal of Tenali revenue division.

Governance 

Pamidimarru gram panchayat is the local self-government of the village. It is divided into wards and each ward is represented by a ward member.

Education 

As per the school information report for the academic year 2018–19, the village has only one MPP school.

See also 
List of villages in Guntur district

References 

Villages in Guntur district